The Danville Dans are a collegiate summer league baseball team located in Danville, Illinois. The team plays in the Prospect League, which their former league, the NCAA-sanctioned Central Illinois Collegiate League, was absorbed into after the 2008 season.

In their history as a CICL team, the Dans won nine tournament titles. Since the merger of the CICL and the Prospect League, the Dans have qualified for the playoffs four times, with their best finish coming in 2010, when they were the runner-up to the league champion, Chillicothe Paints.

The Dans play in the Prospect League's Eastern Conference - Wabash River Division along with the Illinois Valley Pistol Shrimp, Lafayette Aviators, and Terre Haute Rex.

Stadium
The Dans play their home games in 5,021-seat Danville Stadium. During the 2017 season, just under 50,000 people attended Danville Dans games, ranking the stadium as the second-most visited facility in the Prospect League in terms of overall fans and average per game.

Seasons

Roster

References

External links 

Danville Dans blog

1989 establishments in Illinois
Amateur baseball teams in Illinois
Prospect League teams
Baseball teams established in 1989
Dans